The 2016 season is the Harrisburg City Islanders's 13th season of competitive soccer - its thirteenth season in the third division of American soccer and its sixth season in United Soccer League since the league was first created with the City Islanders as one of the original 10 founder-members.

Stadium Relocation 
The 2016 season marks the City Islanders transition from Skyline Sports Complex to FNB Field (formerly Metro Bank Park) on City Island in Harrisburg, Pennsylvania. The transition was a result of the collaboration with the current tenants, the Harrisburg Senators, and to keep pace with the standards being implemented by the USL. The team will also share home matches with Clipper Magazine Stadium in Lancaster, Pennsylvania as an effort to expand the Islanders fanbase throughout south central Pennsylvania.

Roster 

Updated as of July 19, 2016.

Transfers

In

Out

Loan in

Competitions

Preseason 

2016 Harrisburg City Islanders Preseason schedule

USL

Standings (Eastern Conference)

Results 

All times in Eastern Time.

2016 Harrisburg City Islanders Regular Season Schedule

Results summary

U.S. Open Cup 

The City Islanders competed in the 2016 edition of the U.S. Open Cup. During the 2015 edition of the competition, they were eliminated in the third round after conceding three goals in extra time to the Rochester Rhinos. In 2016, the City Islanders advanced through to the fourth round, where they were ultimately defeated in stoppage time by their former MLS affiliate, Philadelphia Union. After a stoppage time equalizer was scored by Bobby Warshaw in the 91st minute, the Union drew a late free kick outside the 18 yard box. The free kick was subsequently shot into the net by Roland Alberg in the third minute of stoppage time.

Statistics 
As of February 4, 2017.

Numbers in parentheses denote appearances as substitute.
Players with names struck through and marked  left the club during the playing season.
Players with names in italics were loaned players.
Players with names marked * were on loan from another club for the whole of their season with Harrisburg.
League denotes USL regular season
Playoffs denotes USL playoffs

Goalkeepers 
As of February 4, 2017.

Record: W-L-D

Honors 
 Week 4 Team of the Week: M Cardel Benbow
 Week 5 Team of the Week: Honorable Mention F Paul Wilson
 Week 10 Team of the Week: F Aaron Wheeler
 Week 17 Team of the Week: M Jose Barril
 Week 21 Team of the Week: M Jose Barril
 2016 All-League Second Team: M  Jose Barril

References 

Harrisburg City Islanders
Harrisburg City Islanders
Penn FC seasons
Harrisburg City Islanders